Tibbits Hall is a university residence at University of New Brunswick, Fredericton, New Brunswick, Canada. It was opened as an all-female residence in 1970, but became a co-ed residence in 2012 on the UNB Fredericton campus. The house holds many traditions such as the charity drive Pushing Carts to Warm Hearts, Hawaiian Luau Dance in orientation week and the biggest Halloween Social on campus. The mascot of Tibbits Hall is the Tibbits Tornadoes and the house color consists of red and white.

History 

Mary K. Tibbits Hall, more commonly known as Tibbits Hall, was established in 1970 as an all-female house. It was named after Mary Kingsley Tibbits (BA, MA, LL.D.) who in 1889 was the first female graduate of the University of New Brunswick. Tibbits Hall was located beside Lady Dunn Hall which was also an all-female residence.

In 1998, Tibbits Hall was joined by Lady Dunn Hall when the residence complex was reconfigured, with the co-ed Joy Kidd House now in the former Lady Dunn Hall building, and Dunn Hall becoming a smaller residence for women behind Kidd House. The three residences formed the Dunn/Kidd/Tibbits "DKT" complex with its own meal hall inside.

In 2011, the house went through a big renovation and had to function as a small residence with approximately 30 female students. During that time, Tibbits residents were moved to the 3T wing of Joy Kidd House. In 2012, UNB Residential Life & Conferencing Services decided to change the house into co-ed style due to the lack of enrolments in single-sex residences. This left UNB Fredericton with only one all-male and one all-female residence (as Neville/Jones, a former all-male residence was made co-ed in 2011-2012). The transition received mixed responses from the residence community and it was one of the most controversial topics of that year.

Started from the school year of 2012 - 2013, Tibbits Hall returned to its original location before the renovation and functioned as a co-ed residence on UNB Fredericton campus. Tibbits saw its first male president in 2013 and remained one of, if not, the best residences on UNB Fredericton campus with great pride and tremendous passion.

Residence organization and house governance 
There are fourteen residences at UNB as of 2013, one men's, one women's, ten co-ed, one apartment style, and one suite style residence. Each residence has its own unique characters, cultures and traditions.

House team 

House Don is a university faculty, staff member, or a senior grad student living in the house who is responsible for the operation of Tibbits Hall. The Don is assisted by four hall proctors and an educational proctor who are senior undergraduates with the role of helping the students adjust to residence and university life. The House Team assumes the responsibility for maintaining order within the immediate vicinity of the residence and meal halls, and also has front line responsibility in crisis response.

House Committee 

House Committee led by the house President is a team elected by residents of Tibbits Hall to act as peer leaders. The committee plays the main role in coordinating house social, educational, charity, athletic activities with the assistance from the Residence Coordinator and the House Team.

As of 2013, Tibbits Hall House Committee includes President, Vice President, Male and Female Social Rep, Male and Female Sport Rep, Charity Rep, Merch Rep, Treasurer, Secretary and First Year Rep (aka Frosh Rep). General elections are usually held in March and First Year Rep election is held in September right after orientation week.

House Orientation Committee 

House Orientation Committee (HOC) is a team consists of ten returning residents chosen by the Don and the returning President to welcome first-year students to the house. HOC acts as peer leaders during orientation week to create a welcoming environment to all the first year and make orientation week one of the best experiences of their lives.

Tibbits Hall HOC jersey is red and white basketball jersey with a tornado on the front and HOC's name on the back. Tibbits Hall proctor jersey has the same design with the colors of black and red instead.

Traditions 

Before the transition to co-ed residence, Tibbits was well known as the most spirited all-female house on UNB Fredericton campus. Tibbits holds many significant tradition with great pride and tremendous passion.

 Pushing Carts to Warm Hearts: Tibbits Hall is widely known for the charity event Pushing Carts to Warm Hearts in late September. At the event, the residents push carts around city of Fredericton to collect non-perishable food items for Fredericton Food Bank. Every year, the Pushing Cart helps to collect more than 1500 food items for the Fredericton Food Bank and promotes the good deeds of charity activities throughout the community.
 Tibbits Hall Halloween Charity Social: Tibbits throws the biggest Halloween Social on UNB Fredericton campus in DKT cafeteria. All of the dance profit is donated to the Fredericton Foodbank. It is always one of the greatest nights on campus and the winning costumes are amazing.
 Dunn & Tibbits Hawaiian Luau: During orientation week, Lady Dunn and Tibbits hosts an annual joint Luau in the courtyard.
 Cheers & House Song: Tibbits cheers are led by the house President.
 Tibbits Christmas: Happens a week before exam time with Secret Santa and Carol. 
 Tibbits Week: The last week of January when the house celebrates its tradition, pride, and passion. For the last few years, Tibbits week starts with Roommate Challenge, followed by Sex & Ice Cream, Games Night, Fantasia Party, Casino Night and House formal.
 Ninja: The house unofficial bonding game where everyone poses as ninjas and makes their moves to eliminate other players until there's only one survivor.
 Tibbits Award: As of 2015, there are 7 big awards to be won (the big 7): Male & Female First Year of the year, Male & Female Athlete of the year, Male & Female Most Spirited of the year, The Mary K. Tibbits Award, and the individual awards of excellence.
 House Events: including house social, formal, assassins, pub tours, intramural sports, house supper, and proctor programs.

As a part of the transition into a co-ed house in 2012-2013, the house started new annual traditions which include Secret Santa in December, roommate challenge, and Casino Night in Tibbits week, new award ceremony at last house supper and changed HOC jerseys from tank tops to basketball jerseys.
Tibbits Karaoke Nights (form. "Wine, Cheese, and Karaoke"): The tradition started in 2016-2017, credited to a German exchange student Aaron. Once a month the whole house comes together and celebrates. The song "Pour Some Sugar On Me", traditionally performed by Scott Laforest, is the house anthem.

Listings of office holders

Tibbits Hall Presidents 

 2021-2022 Sean Ikaia Alviso
 2019-2020 Kordell Walsh
 2017-2018 Sean Gray
 2016-2017 Isayah Vidito
 2016-2016 Jonathan Nicolle
 2015-2016 Monica Forestell
 2015-2015 Erin Callaghan
 2014-2015 Brendan Dale
 2013-2014 Quang Vũ Mai
 2012-2013 Elizabeth Campell / Robert Hanson
 2011-2012 Robyn Mawer
 2010-2011 Kealtie Colwell
 2008-2010 Jessica Seward
 2007-2008 Laura Houghton
 2006-2007 Riki Johnston
 2005-2006 Jill Griffiths
 2004-2005 Kim Martin
 2003-2004 Melaine Richardson
 2002-2003 Jennifer Barry
 2001-2002 Krystyna Fecteau
 2000-2001 Caroline Jarvis
 1999-2000 Jamie-Lynn Rhindress
 1998-1999 Jocelyn Currie
 1997-1998 Mandy McLeod
 1996-1997 Jennifer MacDonald
 1995-1996 Wendy Robertson
 1993-1995 Tracy Johnston
 1992-1993 Anisa Pynn
 1991-1992 Sherry Flynn
 1990-1991 Brenda Wilson
 1989-1990 Norma MacLennan
 1988-1989 Laura Nowlan
 1987-1988 Lori Love
 1986-1987 Lisa DeVos / Natalie Theroux
 1985-1986 Natalie Theroux
 1984-1985 Margaret MacLaughlin
 1983-1984 Kerry Sawyer
 1982-1983 Janet Thornton
 1981-1982 Charlene Boyle
 1980-1981 Lynda Ste Marie
 1979-1980 Heather Reid
 1978-1979 Sandra Richardson
 1977-1978 Lori Hungate
 1976-1977 Kathy Fider
 1975-1976 Mary Thornson
 1974-1975 Dawn Fowler
 1973-1974 Janet Hogg
 1972-1973 Gerry Gaunce
 1971-1972 Jan Moodie
 1970-1971 Linda Paragis

Tibbits Hall Dons 
 2015-2017 Serena Smith
 2014-2015 Brittany Tabor & Michael Tabor
 2011–2014 Maggie Yeomans
 2008-2011 Marie-Paule Godin
 2007-2008 Avelyn Pedro
 2005-2007 Christopher Ryan
 2004-2005 Heather Avery
 2002-2004 Jennifer Roberge-Renaud
 2001-2002 Sherry Golding
 2000-2001 Holly Luhning
 1998-2000 Elizabeth Blaney
 1989-1998 Carol Jordan-Green
 1986-1989 Judy West
 1984-1986 Shelley Courser
 1983-1984 Teresa Hennebery
 1982-1983 Kathleen Loo
 1980-1982 Josie Pobihushchy
 1979-1980 Patricia Doyle
 1977-1979 Raylene Johnson
 1977      Jackie Arsenault
 1975-1976 Ann Heissner
 1972-1975 Vicki Girvan
 1970-1972 Cassie Stanley

Listings of big awards holders

Mary K. Tibbits Award 
(Excellence in House Committee Contribution)
 2017-2018 Brandon Archibald
 2016-2017 Brynn Trofimuk
 2015-2016 Jon Nicolle
 2014-2015 Erin Callaghan
 2013-2014 Quang Vũ Mai
 2012-2013 Robert Hanson

Individual Award of Excellence 
(Individuals have served for at least 2 years in House Team with excellent achievements)
 2015: The White Lion Award of Merit: Kimba Meagher, excellence in academic and extra-curricular achievements
 2015: The Storm of Light Award of Excellence: Quang Vũ Mai, excellence in years of commitment and contribution to Tibbits Hall

UNB Residence Community Leadership Award 
2014-2015
 Tibbits Hall Leadership Award: Jena Guimond
 Community Programming Award: Quang Vũ Mai (Halloween Trick or Treat)
 Unsung Hero Award: Tyler King & Aimee Gillis

2013-2014
 Tibbits Hall Leadership Award: Quang Vũ Mai
 Community Programming Award: Evan Fougere (RAKnomination)
 Unsung Hero Award: Amy Wainright & Cole Bulger

2012-2013
 Tibbits Hall Leadership Award: Mikael Duncan
 Community Programming Award: Mikael Duncan & Michael Roy (Rail Jam)
 Community Leadership Award - honorable mention: Robert Hanson
 Unsung Hero Award: Robert Hanson & Bryce Habraken

See also 
 University of New Brunswick
 The Brunswickan
 Aitken House
 Harrison House (Fredericton)

References

External links
 UNB Residential Life Website - Tibbits Hall
 Tibbits Hall Twitter
 Tibbits Hall 2014-2015 Facebook Group

University of New Brunswick
Buildings and structures in Fredericton
University residences in Canada